Puerto Rico Highway 516 (PR-516) is a tertiary state highway in the northern area of barrio Guaraguao in Ponce, Puerto Rico, near Ponce's border with Adjuntas's barrio Portugués. The road travels east to west. It starts at its intersection with PR-123 and heads west to end at Ponce's border with Peñuelas, from where PR-391 picks up into the municipality of Peñuelas. The road runs through dense mountain vegetation into the interior regions of barrio Guaraguao.

Major intersections

See also

 List of highways in Ponce, Puerto Rico
 List of highways numbered 516

References

External links
 Guía de Carreteras Principales, Expresos y Autopistas 

516
Roads in Ponce, Puerto Rico